|}
The Hon James Murray Robertson is a former Australian politician. He was born 16 February 1945 in Renmark, South Australia; son of Murray and Anna Robertson of Kapunda, South Australia. He married Mary, daughter of Bert and Mary Baskeyfield on 13 April 1973. One daughter, Hilary Jane, born 14 August 1976 in Alice Springs, Northern Territory. He was a Country Liberal Party member of the Northern Territory Legislative Assembly from 1974 to 1986, representing Gillen until 1983 and Araluen thereafter. Robertson was Attorney-General of the Northern Territory during the first Tuxworth Ministry.

Appointments after retiring from the NT Legislative Assembly:

- Chairman of the Northern Territory Grants Commission

- Chairman of the Northern Territory Planning Authority 1989-1996

- NT Representative on the Centenary of Federation Advisory Committee

- Member of the Constitutional Centenary Foundation

- Deputy Chairman NT Statehood Convention 1998

In February 1994, Jim Robertson was appointed by the Prime Minister of Australia to the Centenary of Federation Advisory Committee. The role of the Committee was to plan centenary-related activities in the years leading up to the Centenary of Federation in 2001.

On 13 May 1997, Her Majesty the Queen approved that Mr James Murray Robertson be granted the title 'Honourable' for life.

References

|-

1945 births
Living people
Members of the Northern Territory Legislative Assembly
Country Liberal Party members of the Northern Territory Legislative Assembly
Attorneys-General of the Northern Territory